The Anthoensen Press was an American publishing company based in Portland, Maine, in operation between 1875 and 1987. It was nationally renowned for the quality of the books it created. It published works for several educational institutions, including Bowdoin College, Colby College, as well as for the Peabody Essex Museum, the Boston Athenaeum, the Massachusetts Historical Society and the Limited Editions Club. For part of the 20th century, the Press was located at 105 Middle Street in Portland, before moving to 37 Exchange Street (later expanding into 45 Exchange Street), a space occupied by The Thirsty Pig as of 2023.

The Press also published scholarly journals, including The New England Quarterly, The American Neptune, The Papers of the Bibliographical Society of America and The American Oxonian.

Its 1937 publication, Ancient North Yarmouth and Yarmouth, Maine 1636–1936: A History, covering three centuries of nearby Yarmouth's past, written by William Hutchinson Rowe, was still in publication as of the early 21st century.

History

Establishment
Founded, as the Southworth Press, by the Revd. Francis B. Southworth (1824–1912) in 1875, it published religious material that was given to sailors. (Southworth was the pastor of the Seamen's Bethel Church on Fore Street in Portland.) The Press used linotype machines for its compositions. The composition of certain titles, including A. S. W. Rosenbach's Early American Children's Books (1933), was done by hand.

Frederick Anthoensen
In 1884, a two-year-old, German-born Frederick Wilhelm Anthoensen (1882–1969) emigrated to the United States with his parents, Peter and Betta, from Tønder Municipality, South Jutland, Denmark. While in the Portland schools system, he gained an interest in printing via the works of two Boston printers — Daniel Berkeley Updike and Bruce Rogers. In 1898, a 16-year-old Anthoensen began an apprenticeship at the Southworth Press. He became a full-time compositor in 1901. Sixteen years later, he had become the company's managing director. Anthoensen also wrote two books: John Bell Type: Its Loss and Rediscovery (1939) and Types and Book Making (1943).

Anthoensen broadened the scope of the company's customers beyond the local area, beginning with the Pratt Institute Free Library.

He perpetually searched for old, lost or forgotten types and designs. This led to his possessing the country's largest collection of "rare borders, flowers, and other typographical ornaments" from the 16th to the 18th centuries.

Anthoensen's proof room was known for its ability to process complex academic writing accurately.

From 1920 until after the conclusion of World War II, the Press printed books that were regular inclusions in the American Institute of Graphic Arts' "Fifty Books of the Year" exhibitions. (It was during this period, in 1924, that Anthoensen married Madeleine Hagan, with whom he had one daughter, Greta (1930–2015), who married William L. Chesley in 1953. They were wed for 62 years.)

Anthoensen purchased the company in 1934, initially changing its name to the Southworth–Anthoensen Press, then (by 1944) The Anthoensen Press.

On June 7, 1947, Anthoensen was awarded an honorary degree of Master of Arts from Bowdoin College.

Anthoensen died on August 13, 1969, aged 87. He was interred in Pine Grove Cemetery in Falmouth Foreside, Maine. His wife of 45 years survived him by nineteen years, and was buried beside him upon her death in 1988.

Later years

The company kept its name beyond the death of Anthoensen, starting with its takeover by Warren F. Skillings, firstly, then Harry Milliken. Henry C. Thomas purchased the press in 1982. In 1985, Thomas published The New Anthoensen: In Memory of Fred Anthoensen, 1882–1969, a four-page book containing a two-page letter by Thomas.

In 1983, under Thomas, the company modernized with the introduction of computerized typesetting, to run alongside the traditional linotype and letterpress machines. This outlay did not pay off, however, for the company could not keep up with larger competitors. It went out of business in 1987, after 112 years.

References

External links
"Twenty-one years of the Anthoensen Press, 1947-1967, compiled by Edward F. Dana, Portland, Maine" – Historic New England
Anthoensen Press, 1981 – Portland Public Library

Academic publishing companies
Defunct publishing companies of the United States
Companies based in Portland, Maine
American companies established in 1875
American companies disestablished in 1987
Book publishing companies based in Maine